The 2012 La Manga Cup was an exhibition international club football (soccer) competition featuring football club teams from Europe, which was held in February 2012. All matches were played in La Manga Stadium in La Manga, Spain. This was the fifteenth La Manga Cup. The tournament was won by FC Nordsjælland, who beat Vålerenga on goal differential after both clubs finished with identical records of two wins and one draw.

Teams 
The following six clubs participated in the 2012 tournament:

 FC Dnipro Dnipropetrovsk from the Ukrainian Premier League in Ukraine
 FC Nordsjælland from the Danish Superliga in Denmark
 FK Ekranas from the A Lyga in Lithuania
 Strømsgodset from the Tippeligaen in Norway
 Vålerenga from the Tippeligaen in Norway
 Viking from the Tippeligaen in Norway

Standings
With only six teams entered, the 2012 version of the Cup was contested in a Round Robin style format, wherein each participating team played against three of the other five teams entered in the competition, with the winner determined by points earned.

Matches

References

2012
2011–12 in Ukrainian football
2011–12 in Danish football
2012 in Lithuanian football
2012 in Norwegian football